Hugo Portisch (19 February 1927 – 1 April 2021) was a long standing, broadly recognized and popular Austrian journalist, as well as writer.

Awards and honours 
 2010: Concordia Honorary Award
 2012: Julius Raab Medal
 2014: renewed Journalist of the Year Award for his life's work
 2015: Viktor Frankl Prize
 2016: Honorary Citizen of St. Pölten
 2018: Honorary Citizen of the City of Vienna
 2019: Grand Decoration of Honour in Gold for Services to the Republic of Austria

References

External links
 Hugo Portisch - Kosmopolit, Humanist und überzeugter Europäer

Austrian journalists
1927 births
2021 deaths
Kurier editors